Ardisia oligantha is a name which has been given to several species of plants:
Ardisia oligantha , described in 1885, now known as Oncostemum oliganthum 
Ardisia oligantha , described in 1902, an illegitimate later homonym
Ardisia oligantha , described in 1912, an illegitimate later homonym replaced by Ardisia oligocarpa 
Ardisia oligantha , combined in 1979, an illegitimate later homonym replaced by Ardisia marcellanum 

oligantha